Bear Ye One Another's Burden is a 1988 East German drama film directed by Lothar Warneke. It was entered into the 38th Berlin International Film Festival, where Manfred Möck and Jörg Pose won the Silver Bear for Best Actor.

Cast

References

External links

1988 films
1988 drama films
German drama films
East German films
1980s German-language films
Films directed by Lothar Warneke
1980s German films